Al Lusail was launched by Lürssen at their yard near Bremen. The yacht’s exterior is the design work of H2 Yacht Design. March & White was selected by the owner to create the custom interior.

Design 
The hull is built out of steel while the superstructure is made out of aluminium with teak laid decks. The yacht is classed by Lloyd's Register and flagged in Qatar.

Amenities 
The Eclipse is equipped with zero speed stabilizers, a gym, elevator, swimming pool, movie theatre, tender garage with a  utility tender, a  D-RIB and two limousine tenders, swimming platform, air conditioning, BBQ, beach club, beauty room, helicopter landing pad, underwater lights, and beauty salon.

See also
 List of motor yachts by length
 List of yachts built by Lürssen

References

2016 ships
Motor yachts
Ships built in Germany